Pazhayakunnummel  is a village in Thiruvananthapuram district in the state of Kerala, India.

Demographics
 India census, Pazhayakunnummel had a population of 25007 with 11735 males and 13272 females.

References

Villages in Thiruvananthapuram district